This article provides a list of Venezuelan (Bolivarian) military aircraft currently in service or on order with the Bolivarian Military Aviation, previously called the Venezuelan Air Force.

Current inventory

References

Bolivian military aviation
Aviation in Venezuela
Military equipment of Venezuela
Venezuela-related lists